Palestine High School could mean:

 Palestine High School (Illinois), a public school in Palestine, Illinois and Palestine Community Unit School District 3; teams are the Pioneers or Tigers
 Palestine High School (Ohio), a defunct public school in Palestine, Ohio
 Palestine High School (Texas), the current public high school in Palestine, Texas and the Palestine Independent School District; teams are the Wildcats
 Palestine–Wheatley High School, a public school in Palestine, Arkansas and the Palestine–Wheatley School District; teams are the Patriots
 Museum for East Texas Culture, whose historic building was formerly known as Palestine High School

See also
 Education in the Palestinian territories#Secondary Education for information about high school education in the territory of Palestine
 East Palestine High School, a public high school in East Palestine, Ohio
 New Palestine High School, a public high school in New Palestine, Indiana